The Battle of Varize was a battle in the Franco-Prussian War, that happened on November 29, 1870, in Varize, on the river Conie. In this battle, the First Bavarian Corps under the command of Lieutenant General Infantry Ludwig von der Tann attacked a guerrilla army franc-tireurs of the French Republic under the command of Colonel Ernest de Lipowski, and made them scatter. Despite this, the defense at Varize enabled General Antoine Chanzy, commander of the French Army of Loire, to establish a defensive formation against the Prussian army under the direction of Friedrich Franz II, Grand Duke of Mecklenburg-Schwerin. With their victory at the Battle of Varize, Bavarian forces captured a number of well-equipped French guerrillas.

Battle
The Bavarian I Corps under General Von der Tann, was on its way from Châteaudun to Orgires, as it approached Civry, they attacked several French franc-tireur guerilla detachments led by Colonel Lipowski at Varize. After the German midfield batteries fired several rounds, the French were driven out of their defensive positions. Subsequently, two German battalions invaded and captured the post-war Varize which was left for prisoners of war. French resistance at Varize failed. Although German casualties numbered 450, when the cavalry scouts on the right found that the vicinity was empty of French troops, the Bavarian I Corps resumed its march and reached Orgferes at 11 o'clock. The battle cost the French 147 men, of whom 10 were killed, 37 wounded, while 100 were captured.

On December 1, 1870, General Chanzy, in command of the French Army of Loire attacked the Bavarians at the Battle of Villepion to eliminate the threat to the north. This was the second and final victory of the Loire Army over the German army. On December 2, Prussian forces led by Mecklenburg defeated Chanzy at the Battle of Loigny-Poupry.

References

1870 in France
Conflicts in 1870
Varize
Battles involving Bavaria
Battles involving France
November 1870 events